The American Legion Cabin on State Highway 6 in Potlatch, Idaho was constructed in 1928–29.  It was listed on the National Register of Historic Places in 1986 because of its historically significant architecture.  It was designed as a bungalow with American Craftsman influenceBungalow/Craftsman architecture and served as a clubhouse.

It is a one-and-a-half-story L-shaped log bungalow building.  It is significant as one of few privately built buildings in the company town of Potlatch, for its association with the American Legion, and as one of few social settings where company workers and managers interacted.  It is a memorial to World War I servicemen from Potlatch.  As of 1985 it was owned by the American Legion chapter but was leased out as a restaurant.

See also
 National Register of Historic Places listings in Latah County, Idaho

References

American Legion buildings
Clubhouses on the National Register of Historic Places in Idaho
Buildings and structures completed in 1928
Bungalow architecture in Idaho
American Craftsman architecture in Idaho
National Register of Historic Places in Latah County, Idaho
Log buildings and structures on the National Register of Historic Places in Idaho